Shivgopal Krishna (born 8 April 1984) is an Indian film writer and director. He is best known in the Telugu film industry for his debutant written film Bank (2008). Recently he is working on a Hindi film script and planning to direct himself.

Early life
Shivgopal was born on 8 April 1984 in Agra, India, to a Telugu family. His father is a Government employee in BSNL. He had a Tamil-Telugu speaking upbringing in Agra.

Education and early career
Shivgopal Krishna studied bachelor computer applications BCA in Agra and also has a bachelor's degree in Arts. He worked as an assistant director for Hindi, Tamil, Telugu, Punjabi movies and many TV series. He also worked as a writer for Bank. He worked as casting director for Sagar Pictures and Colosceum Media Pvt. Ltd.

Filmography

Films

Television

References

External links
 

Hindi-language film directors
Indian male screenwriters
Telugu film directors
Telugu screenwriters
Indian Tamil people
Screenwriters from Uttar Pradesh
Living people
People from Agra
1984 births
21st-century Indian film directors